MTV Flux was a television channel in the United Kingdom and Ireland. The version in the UK and Ireland launched on 6 September 2006. The brand started as a website on 1 August. It used bandwidth that was originally used to broadcast VH2. There is an MTV 'Flux' channel in Japan, which launched in 2007.

Unlike VH2, which focused mainly on indie music, MTV Flux broadcast a wider range of music and music-related programming, with styles ranging from current chart hits to classic pop/rock songs.  The idea of the channel was to give viewers "control" by allowing them to send in video clips to the website and the TV channel if approved by the online community and (for television broadcast) MTV.
The channel also showed music videos.

Shows
The first show broadcast on MTV Flux was: Up, Up, Down, Down... (short for the complete Konami Code which serves as its full official title), an hour-long show, hosted by Colin Griffiths nominally about computer games interspersed with music videos and user-submitted content.

Other shows included:
Flux Me I'm Famous: A mixture of shoutouts where members of the public throw to their own flux profiles and advertise themselves, user generated films and music videos.
Obsession Session: Dedicated fans tell all about themselves and the bands they adore.
POD stars: The zen den where celebrities hang out and do anything in the Flux POD, an inflatable white enclave. Followed by their music videos.
The Great MTV Flux Run (Summer 2007): an interactive sports show hosted by Rob Petit. 
Fan Clash: an interactive show where fans of bands compete head-to-head for the coveted 'Snart'.

Website
The MTV Flux website allows users to register and create a unique web page in the style of social networking sites like MySpace. This page allows users create avatars and upload pictures and video.

Closure
On 21 January 2008 AGB Nielsen Media Research announced for BARB subscribers that MTV Flux would be rebranded as MTV One +1 on 1 February 2008. MTV Flux ceased at 6am with MTV One +1 launching at 12noon on the same day.

References

External links
MTV Flux at MTV.co.uk (Archived 3 October 2007)
 at MTV Flux Japan

MTV channels
Defunct television channels in the United Kingdom
Television channels and stations established in 2006
Television channels and stations disestablished in 2008